Jordan A. Roos (born July 6, 1993) is an American football guard for the Tennessee Titans of the National Football League (NFL). He played college football at Purdue and was signed with the Seattle Seahawks as an undrafted free agent following the 2017 NFL Draft. Roos attended Celina High School in Celina, Texas.

College career
Roos played for the Purdue Boilermakers from 2012 to 2016. He was the team's starter his final three and a half years and helped the Boilermakers to a nine wins. He played in 47 games during his career including 42 starts at right guard.

Professional career

Seattle Seahawks
After going undrafted in the 2017 NFL Draft, Roos signed as an undrafted free agent with the Seattle Seahawks on April 29, 2017. Roos played in all four of the Seahawks preseason games and made their regular season 53-man roster.

On September 1, 2018, Roos was waived by the Seahawks and was re-signed to the practice squad. He signed a reserve/future contract on January 7, 2019.

On August 31, 2019, Roos was waived by the Seahawks and was signed to the practice squad the next day. He was promoted to the active roster on October 11, 2019.

On October 23, 2019, Roos was waived by the Seahawks and re-signed to the practice squad. He was promoted back to the active roster on October 29.

Roos re-signed with the Seahawks on April 21, 2020. He was released on July 26, 2020.

Las Vegas Raiders
On July 27, 2020, Roos was claimed off waivers by the Las Vegas Raiders. He was waived on September 1, 2020.

New England Patriots
On October 1, 2020, Roos was signed to the New England Patriots practice squad. He was released on October 27.

Tennessee Titans
On August 7, 2021, Roos signed with the Tennessee Titans. He was waived on August 31, 2021 and re-signed to the practice squad. After the Titans were eliminated in the Divisional Round of the 2021 playoffs, he signed a reserve/future contract on January 24, 2022.

On August 30, 2022, Roos was waived by the Titans and signed to the practice squad the next day. He was promoted to the active roster on October 1. He was waived again on December 10. He was re-signed to the practice squad four days later. He was promoted to the active roster three days later.

References

External links
Purdue Boilermakers profile

1993 births
Living people
American football offensive linemen
Las Vegas Raiders players
New England Patriots players
People from Collin County, Texas
People from Denton County, Texas
Players of American football from Texas
Purdue Boilermakers football players
Seattle Seahawks players
Sportspeople from the Dallas–Fort Worth metroplex
Tennessee Titans players